"The Owl and the Pussy-cat" is a nonsense poem by Edward Lear, first published in 1870 in the American magazine Our Young Folks: an Illustrated Magazine for Boys and Girls and again the following year in Lear's own book Nonsense Songs, Stories, Botany, and Alphabets. Lear wrote the poem for a three-year-old girl, Janet Symonds, the daughter of Lear's friend and fellow poet John Addington Symonds and his wife Catherine Symonds. The term "runcible", used for the phrase "runcible spoon", was invented for the poem.

Synopsis 
"The Owl and the Pussy-cat" features four anthropomorphic animals – an owl, a cat, a pig, and a turkey – and tells the story of the love between the title characters who marry in the land "where the Bong-tree grows".

Unfinished sequel
Portions of an unfinished sequel, "The Children of the Owl and the Pussy-cat" were published first posthumously, during 1938. The children are part fowl and part cat, and love to eat mice.

The family live by places with strange  names. The Cat dies, falling from a tall tree, leaving the Owl a single parent. The death causes the Owl great sadness. The money is all spent, but the Owl still sings to the original guitar.

Media 

 Beatrix Potter wrote a prequel, The Tale of Little Pig Robinson, telling the background story of the pig character.
The story has been set to music and animated many times, such as by:
Humphrey Searle in 1951, using twelve-tone technique for the accompanying flute, guitar, and cello, but sprechgesang for the vocal part
 Elton Hayes made a recording of the Hely-Hutchinson setting for Parlophone. during 1953.
 It was the main topic of The Owl and the Pussycat Went to See..., a 1968 children's musical play about Lear's nonsense poems.  The play was written by Sheila Ruskin and David Wood.
In 1996, Eric Idle published a children's novel, The Quite Remarkable Adventures of the Owl and the Pussycat, based on the poem. Idle's narriation of the audiobook was nominated for the 1998 Grammy Award for Best Spoken Word Album for Children.
 In 1998, Naxos Records produced album "Seven Ages: An Anthology of Poetry with Music" which contains a recording of John Cleese reading The Owl and the Pussycat on track 15.
 Composer Deborah Kavasch of the Extended Vocal Techniques Ensemble (established at the University of California, San Diego, 1972) composed The Owl and the Pussycat, a setting of the poem, for the ensemble. It was published in 1980 by Edition Reimers.
 American avant-garde artist and composer Laurie Anderson’s 5th album, Bright Red (1994) features the track ″Beautiful Pea Green Boat″ with additional lyrics from the poem.

See also

 The Wind in the Willows

References

External links

The Owl and the Pussy-cat in many languages (archive from 1 August 2015; accessed 10 July 2019)
Reely's Poetry Pages – audio of The Owl and The Pussycat (Anthology of English Verse, vol. 1)
"Pea Green Boat" by comedian Stewart Lee
The Owl and the Pussycat by Storynory
"The Owl & the Pussycat" recited by Dawn Miceli from The Dawn and Drew Show
Tales of Curiosity short video, text and images of The Owl and the Pussy-cat
Setting of poem as a song by Ronald Corp performed by Mark Stone and Simon Lepper
"The Owl & the Pussycat" by Elton Hayes

1871 poems
19th-century British children's literature
Children's poems
Fictional guitarists
Poetry by Edward Lear
Poems about birds
Cats in literature